Hannelore Burosch (later Kühnert, born 16 November 1947) is a former East German handball player, born in Rostock, who competed in the 1976 Summer Olympics.

In 1976, she won the silver medal with the East German team. She played one match.

References

External links
Profile on databaseolympics.com

1947 births
Living people
Sportspeople from Rostock
German female handball players
Olympic handball players of East Germany
Handball players at the 1976 Summer Olympics
Olympic silver medalists for East Germany
Olympic medalists in handball
Medalists at the 1976 Summer Olympics
Recipients of the Patriotic Order of Merit in bronze